François-Marie-Joseph Poirier (born 1904 in Néant) was a French clergyman and Archbishop of the Roman Catholic Archdiocese of Port-au-Prince. He was ordained in 1928. He was appointed bishop in 1955. He died in 1976.

References 

1904 births
1976 deaths
French Roman Catholic bishops
Roman Catholic archbishops of Port-au-Prince